Susanna Moodie ( Strickland; 6 December 1803 – 8 April 1885) was an English-born Canadian author who wrote about her experiences as a settler in Canada, which was a British colony at the time.

Biography
Susanna Moodie was born in Bungay, on the River Waveney in Suffolk. She was the youngest sister in a family of writers, including Agnes Strickland, Jane Margaret Strickland and Catharine Parr Traill. She wrote her first children's book in 1822 and published other children's stories in London, including books about Spartacus and Jugurtha. In London she was also involved in the Anti-Slavery Society, transcribing the narrative of the former Caribbean slave Mary Prince. 

On 4 April 1831, she married John Moodie, a retired officer who had served in the Napoleonic Wars.

In 1832, with her husband, a British Army officer, and daughter, Moodie immigrated to Upper Canada. The family settled on a farm in Douro township, near Lakefield, north of Peterborough, where her brother Samuel Strickland (1804–1867) worked as a surveyor, and where artifacts are housed in a museum. Founded by Samuel, the museum was formerly an Anglican church and overlooks the Otonabee River where Susanna once canoed. It also displays artifacts concerning Samuel, as well as her elder sister and fellow writer Catharine, who married a friend of John Moodie's and immigrated to the same area a few weeks before Susanna and John.

Moodie continued to write in Canada, and her letters and journals contain valuable information about life in the colony. She observed life in what was then the backwoods of Ontario, including native customs, the climate, the wildlife, relations between the Canadian population and recent American settlers, and the strong sense of community and the communal work, known as "bees" (which she, incidentally, hated). She suffered through the economic depression in 1836, and her husband served in the militia against William Lyon Mackenzie in the Upper Canada Rebellion in 1837.

As a middle-class Englishwoman, Moodie did not particularly enjoy "the bush", as she called it. In 1840, she and her husband moved to Belleville, which she referred to as "the clearings." She studied the Family Compact and became sympathetic to the moderate reformers led by Robert Baldwin, while remaining critical of radical reformers such as William Lyon Mackenzie. This caused problems for her husband, who shared her views, but, as sheriff of Belleville, had to work with members and supporters of the Family Compact.

In 1852, she published Roughing it in the Bush, detailing her experiences on the farm in the 1830s. In 1853, she published Life in the Clearings Versus the Bush, about her time in Belleville. She remained in Belleville, living with various family members (particularly her son Robert) after her husband's death, and lived to see Canadian Confederation. She died in Toronto, Ontario on 8 April 1885 and is buried in Belleville Cemetery.

Her greatest literary success was Roughing it in the Bush. The inspiration for the memoir came from a suggestion by her editor that she write an "emigrant's guide" for British people looking to move to Canada. Moodie wrote of the trials and tribulations she found as a "New Canadian", rather than the advantages to be had in the colony. She claimed that her intention was not to discourage immigrants but to prepare people like herself, raised in relative wealth and with no prior experience as farmers, for what life in Canada would be like.

Moodie taught her daughter Agnes how to paint flowers and Agnes later illustrated Canadian Wild Flowers, published in 1868.

Recognition
Moodie's books and poetry inspired Margaret Atwood's collection of poetry, The Journals of Susanna Moodie, published in 1970. It was also an important influence on one of Atwood's later novels, Alias Grace, based on an account of murder convict Grace Marks which appeared in Life in the Clearings Versus the Bush. She has also been a source of inspiration for Carol Shields, who published a critical analysis of Moodie's work, Susanna Moodie: Voice and Vision. Additionally, the central character of Shields' novel, Small Ceremonies, is working on a biography of Moodie.

Commemorative postage stamp
On 8 September 2003, to commemorate the 50th anniversary of the National Library of Canada, Canada Post released a special commemorative series, "The Writers of Canada", with a design by Katalina Kovats, featuring two English-Canadian and two French-Canadian stamps. Three million stamps were issued. Moodie and her sister Catherine Parr Traill were featured on one of the English-Canadian stamps.

Bibliography

Novels
 Mark Hurdlestone – 1853
 Flora Lyndsay – 1854
 Matrimonial Speculations – 1854
 Geoffrey Moncton – 1855
 The World Before Them – 1868

Poetry
 Patriotic Songs – 1830 (with Agnes Strickland)
 Enthusiasm and Other Poems – 1831

Children's books
 Spartacus – 1822
 The Little Quaker
 The Sailor Brother
 The Little Prisoner
 Hugh Latimer – 1828
 Rowland Massingham
 Profession and Principle
 George Leatrim – 1875

Memoirs
 Roughing it in the Bush – 1852
 Life in the Backwoods; A Sequel to Roughing It in the Bush
 Life in the Clearings Versus the Bush – 1853

Letters
 Letters of a Lifetime – 1985 (edited by Carl Ballstadt, Elizabeth Hopkins, and Michael Peterman)

References

External links 

 Biography at the Dictionary of Canadian Biography Online
 
 
 
 
 Moodie, Susanna. Life in the clearings versus the bush. London : Richard Bentley, 1853. Accessed 18 July 2012, in PDF format.
 Ashton Warner – Slave Narrative of St Vincent, British West Indies 1831
 Records collection related to Susanna Moddie (Susanna Moodie collection, R10880) are held at Library and Archives Canada
 Archives related to Susanna Moodie and her family (Moddie, Strickland, Vickers, Ewing family fonds, R11782) are held at Library and Archives Canada

Canadian children's writers
Canadian women short story writers
Canadian women novelists
Canadian women poets
English emigrants to pre-Confederation Ontario
English women writers
English short story writers
British women short story writers
English memoirists
19th-century English novelists
19th-century English poets
Victorian women writers
People from Bungay
1803 births
1885 deaths
19th-century Canadian women writers
19th-century Canadian poets
19th-century Canadian novelists
19th-century Canadian short story writers
Immigrants to Upper Canada
Persons of National Historic Significance (Canada)
British women memoirists
Canadian women children's writers